Owrang or Avarang or Avrang may refer to:
 Owrang, East Azerbaijan
 Owrang, Sistan and Baluchestan